A corruption scandal in the Judiciary of Ghana in September 2015 following an exposé by investigative journalist Anas Aremyaw Anas

History
Anas conducted a two-year an undercover investigation of the judiciary in Ghana and brought out audio and video evidence of corruption taking place.

Following the exposé, 22 circuit court judges and magistrates were suspended and 12 High Court judges were also under investigations.

Judges indicted
The twelve Judges of the High Court who were indicted in this scandal include:

Justice Essel Mensah
Justice Charles Quist
Justice Peter U. Dery
Justice John Ajet Nassam
Justice Ernest Obimpe
Justice Mustapha Habib Logoh
Justice Yaw Ansu-Gyeabour
Justice Ayisi Addo
Justice Mohammed Iddrisu
Justice Yaw Badu
Justice Heward Mills

See also
Corruption in Ghana
List of corruption cases in Ghana

References

Scandals in Ghana
Judiciary of Ghana
Corruption in Ghana 
2015 scandals
2015 in Ghana  
2015 crimes in Ghana